Campus Cops is an American sitcom that aired on the USA network on Saturday nights from January 6 until March 30, 1996 for a total of 13 episodes.

Premise
The series centered on bumbling campus policeman, Wayne Simko and Andy McCormack, who worked at Canfield University.

Cast
 Ryan Hurst as Wayne Simko
 Ben Bode as Andy McCormack
 Jerry Kernion as Elliot Royce
 Monte Markham as Dean Walter Pilkington
 LaRita Shelby as Meg DuVry
 JD Cullum as Ray Raskin
 David Sage as Captain Hingle

Episodes

References

External links

USA Network original programming
1996 American television series debuts
1996 American television series endings
1990s American single-camera sitcoms
English-language television shows
Television series by Universal Television